The Spices Board is the Indian government regulatory and export promotion agency for Indian spices headed by a Chairman, rank equivalent to Joint Secretary to Government of India. The board is headquartered in Kochi. Presently, Shri A G Thankappan is the Chairman of Spices Board .

Spices Board was constituted in  under Spices Board Act 1986 with the responsibility of production/development of cardamom and export promotion of 52 spices shown in the schedule of the Act.

The board has a state-of-the-art testing laboratory at its headquarters in Kochi. There are also regional laboratories at Mumbai, Chennai, Delhi, Tuticorin, Kandla and Guntur. Through the laboratories, the Spices Board makes mandatory quality checks for spices exported from India.

The Spices Board has an outlet next to its headquarters in Kochi. Spices are sold under the brand 'Flavourit'.

The Spices Board of India has started an online campaign, called the Spice Train, to educate Indians about the country's rich spice heritage 

Spices Board provides information on several spices grown and exported from India 

 The Spice Park of Spices Board India for cardamom and pepper is situated at Puttady.

References

External links
 Official website
 Spice Board Registration

Indian spices
Commodity markets in India
Export promotion agencies of India
Companies based in Kochi
Ministry of Commerce and Industry (India)
Commodity markets in Kerala
Government agencies established in 1987
1987 establishments in Kerala